Danilo Enrique León Lineco (born April 3, 1967) is a Venezuelan former professional relief pitcher in Major League Baseball. Listed at 6' 1" (1.85 m), 170 lb. (77 k), he batted and threw right handed.

In addition, he pitched in the Venezuelan Professional Baseball League and Mexican Baseball.

In , he posted a combined record of 10 wins with 3 losses along with a 1.38 earned run average and 115 strikeouts in 130 innings pitched.

León made his major league debut with the Texas Rangers in 1992, but only managed to post a 5.89 earned run average in 18 innings and returned to play in the minor leagues the following season.

In between, he pitched in the Venezuelan league for 15 seasons, most notably for the Águilas del Zulia club. He ended his career in 2005 at the age of 37.

Highlights
On November 23, 1999, León hurled a 2–0 no-hitter against the Tigres de Aragua at Estadio Luis Aparicio El Grande in Maracaibo.

He also has the second most strikeouts in Águilas team history, being surpassed only by Julio Machado.

See also
 List of Major League Baseball players from Venezuela

References

External links
"Danilo León Statistics". The Baseball Cube. 15 January 2008.
Retrosheet

1967 births
Águilas del Zulia players
Caribes de Oriente players
Charros de Jalisco players
Gulf Coast Expos players
Jacksonville Expos players
Jamestown Expos players
Leones de Yucatán players
Living people
Major League Baseball pitchers
Major League Baseball players from Venezuela
Mexican League baseball pitchers
Nashville Sounds players
Oklahoma City 89ers players
People from Zulia
Petroleros de Cabimas players
Charlotte Rangers players
Texas Rangers players
Tulsa Drillers players
Venezuelan expatriate baseball players in Mexico
Venezuelan expatriate baseball players in the United States
West Palm Beach Expos players